In the Groove is a series of music video games that uses a four-panel dance pad. The series was first developed by Roxor Games during a time when four-panel dance games in the arcade market were on the decline. As of October 18, 2006, Konami (makers of Dance Dance Revolution) has acquired the intellectual property rights to the series.

Gameplay

The gameplay mechanics of In the Groove are very similar to Konami's Dance Dance Revolution series, involving stepping in time to the general rhythm or beat of a song using a four-arrowed Dance Pad. During normal gameplay, color arrows scroll upwards from the bottom of the screen and pass over a set of gray, stationary arrows near the top (referred to as "targets"). When the scrolling arrows overlap the stationary ones, the player must step on the corresponding arrow(s) on the dance platform. Longer arrows referred to as "Holds" must be held down for their entire length for them to count. "Rolls" (as introduced in In the Groove 2), which appear to be spiky, green and yellow holds, must be rapidly tapped (like a drumroll, hence the name) for them to count. Mines deduct score and health if a player's foot is on an arrow when they pass by the corresponding target arrow on-screen.

On the player's far side of the screen is a life bar. This is affected by the accuracy judgements the player receives for hitting (or missing) arrows. Most machines have the Auto-Fail feature turned off - that is, any player whose life bar empties during a song can still finish playing that song, but will be failed at its conclusion. All machines will immediately fail any player who stops hitting arrows long enough to accrue 30 misses in a row. Similar to other dancing games, the player is judged for how accurately they step relative to when they were supposed to step. From highest to lowest, possible judgements are "Fantastic," "Excellent," "Great," "Decent," "Way Off," and "Miss". For holds and rolls, if the player finishes the hold or roll successfully, they receive a "Yeah!" judgement. If not, the player receives a "Bad". In the middle of the screen, the game keeps track of a player's current "combo," which is the length of the player's most recent chain of good timing judgements. A player's combo carries over from one song to the next, typically ending at the conclusion of a credit. However, if the player utilizes a USB card to keep track of their scores, their combo will also carry over from one credit to the next. The game has safety nets for players on easy difficulties that allows them to play all of the songs on their credit without failing out.
At the end of the song, the results screen displays a grade for each player based on the percentage of points that they got.

Development

In the Groove is based on a modified version of the free and open source StepMania engine, which was originally designed to simulate the Dance Dance Revolution series. ITG was produced in the United States, and the majority of the In the Groove fanbase consists of players who desire songs and step patterns of a higher difficulty than those found in Dance Dance Revolution. A total of 72 songs are available in the original release of the game, ten of which are unlockable and one of which (Liquid Moon) is only available at the end of a single Marathon course.

RedOctane published a PlayStation 2 version of In the Groove. This version has all the features and songs from the arcade release, in addition to four "preview songs" from the arcade version of In the Groove 2. The game reached store shelves on June 17, 2005, and introduced several new gameplay features, including the Novice difficulty, new Marathon courses, and new Fitness and Training modes.

At the 2005 Amusement Showcase International in Chicago, IL, Roxor Games announced that In the Groove 2 would be released with its own dedicated cabinet as well as an upgrade kit for old In The Groove conversion kits. The new cabinet was initially produced by Andamiro, the creators of Pump It Up, another dance-simulation game. However, in 2006 Roxor announced that they themselves would take over cabinet production for In The Groove 2 dedicated cabinets. In The Groove 2 was also made available as a conversion kit for older Dance Dance Revolution machines. In The Groove 2 features 65 new songs, as well as every song and course from the original release of In The Groove. Although a PlayStation 2 version of ITG2 was never released, the PC version (based on the first game) received a patch adding all the songs from ITG2 plus the new theme.

On May 9, 2005, Konami of Japan filed a complaint with the U.S. District Court for the Eastern District of Texas, asking for an injunction against Roxor and payment of damages, based on "Konami's patent and trademark rights in its Dance Dance Revolution arcade game" and unfair competition law. Konami claims that the refitting of arcade cabinets "has been done in an infringing and unfair way". This did not affect the PlayStation 2 game, which was released as planned. On July 10, 2005, however, Konami amended its complaint to include the In the Groove PS2 game and its publisher RedOctane. On July 25, 2005, Roxor Games filed a counterclaim against Konami. In the counterclaim, Roxor denies most of the claims in Konami's complaint. Roxor Games also claims that In the Groove does not violate patent law and that Konami has engaged in unfair competition. However, the lawsuit ultimately ended in a settlement where Konami would acquire the In the Groove intellectual property rights and that Roxor would "respect Konami’s intellectual property rights".

On January 14, 2006, at the In the Groove North American Tournament Finals in Las Vegas, Roxor announced that the arcade release of In the Groove 3 and the home release of In the Groove 2 would take place sometime during 2006. ITG3 was to be previewed at the Amusement & Music Operators Association Expo 2006 convention in Las Vegas, though was absent from Roxor's presentation area, presumably due to delays in the game's production. The release of In the Groove 3 and home release of In the Groove 2 never happened, as Konami gained the intellectual property rights to the series and presumably cancelled future In The Groove projects. Some songs that were to debut on ITG3 found their way into Pump It Up Pro and Pump It Up NX2. Due to the open nature of the Stepmania platform used by ITG, the discovery of the ability to add custom songs to an ITG machine, and a patch for In the Groove 2 called "r21" (which adds support for custom songs, released shortly before the lawsuit) many fans of the series have used leaked song and incomplete step files from ITG3 to try and rebuild it as a fan-created product.

After the lawsuit, some of the former developers of In The Groove went on to develop other rhythm and dance game projects. Kyle Ward and several other of ITG's developers and musicians later formed a new company, Fun in Motion. In association with Andamiro, they produced Pump It Up Pro, Pro 2, and Jump, spinoffs of the Pump It Up series featuring music and features carried over from In the Groove. Kyle Ward later worked with Positive Gaming and other collaborators to create IDance, a dancing game similar to In The Groove that allowed up to 32 players to play concurrently using Bluetooth-connected pads. Afterwards, he co-founded a new company, Step Revolution, LLC (initially named "Step 'Evolution' LLC"), to produce more rhythm games, such as '"ReRave"', '"DittoBeat"', '"ReRave Plus"', and StepManiaX.

Technical details
In the Groove is built on a complete PC system dubbed the "Boxor" which runs a heavily modified version of the Debian Linux distribution. The computer contains a standard IDE hard disk (usually 40gb or 80gb in size), single-core 32-bit processor (Usually AMD Athlon or Intel Celeron), 128mb nVidia GeForce FX 5200 graphics card, 256MB or 512MB of DDR RAM, a Gigabyte Technology GA-8IPE1000 Pro2 motherboard, and a USB 2.0 hub (Cypress EZ-USB FX2) for transferring user statistics and edits onto a flash drive. On upgrade kits for Dance Dance Revolution machines, The Boxor includes a special I/O board called "ITGIO" for making a JAMMA connection to the machine. Some Boxors have slightly different hardware than others. The software used to run the game is a proprietary fork of the open source StepMania computer program. Anti-piracy measures are achieved through the use of a "serial dongle" which prevents execution of the software on an unlicensed computer. Certain versions of the In the Groove 2 cabinet - in particular the ones manufactured by Andamiro, have BIOS passwords. In this situation users have to bypass the password by resetting the BIOS on the motherboard. This is typically done by removing the power cord and CMOS battery, then activating CMOS_PWD reset jumper on the motherboard of the computer.

Music

A total of 135 songs are available to play in the In The Groove arcade series. A few additional songs are exclusive to the home version for PC and Mac. Kyle Ward (also known as KaW, Inspector K, Banzai, E-Racer, and Smiley) is the developer's house musician, who composed many of the songs. Another 56 artists can be found in the series.

Games
In the Groove (video game)
In the Groove 2

References

Dance video games
 
Konami franchises
Video game franchises